WNKJ-TV (analog channel 51) was a television station in Hopkinsville, Kentucky, United States. Owned by Doxa Communications, Inc., the station had studios on East 18th Street in downtown Hopkinsville.

History 
The station signed on the air as an independent station in October 1983. Except for W64BR (later W64AV), a low-powered translator of Kentucky Educational Television (KET) affiliate WKMA-TV of Madisonville, it was the first television station ever to sign on in the Hopkinsville area. W43AG, which at the time was under ownership of the Kentucky New Era newspaper, signed on the air more than one month later. Hopkinsville was and still is considered to be in the Nashville, Tennessee media market, and only the Nashville area's big three television stations (e.g. WKRN, WSMV and WTVF), along with Madisonville-based WLCN (later WB/CW affiliate WAZE-TV), provided the best-quality signal coverage at the time of WNKJ's existence. ABC affiliate WBKO in Bowling Green, Kentucky had also been providing at least Grade B signal coverage in the Christian County area as Hopkinsville was as far west as that signal can reach.

The station's programming lineup consisted of religious programs, old sitcoms, a few movies and cartoons in barter syndication.

In spite of an acceptable terrestrial signal with 254,700 watts effective radiated power, due to poor viewership, the station went dark in 1985. The station's broadcast license was returned to the FCC in 1986. This made W43AG (later WKAG-CA) the sole locally based television station in Hopkinsville until it went off the air in 2011.

Post-existence 
In the early 1990s, another television station was also slated to go on the air on UHF channel 51 under a different licensee, with the callsign of WKKT-TV. The licensee, which filed an application with the FCC in 1988, never made it to the air, at least according to Broadcasting Yearbooks from 1988 to 1993.

References 

NKJ-TV
Television channels and stations established in 1983
Television channels and stations disestablished in 1985
1983 establishments in Kentucky
1985 disestablishments in Kentucky
Defunct television stations in the United States
Independent television stations in the United States
Hopkinsville, Kentucky
NKJ-TV